You is the second extended play by English singer-songwriter Dodie. The EP was self-released by Dodie through her record label Doddleoddle on 11 August 2017.

Background
All of the EP's tracks had previously appeared as demos on Dodie's YouTube channel. "Would You Be So Kind", "6/10", "Secret For the Mad" were released in 2016, and "You", "Instrumental", and an acoustic version of "In the Middle" were released in 2017.

Promotion
"6/10" was released as the EP's first single as part of the pre-order on 7 July 2017. A music video for the song was released on 29 September 2017. Official music videos were also released for "You", "In The Middle" and "Secret For The Mad" on 27 October 2017, 15 December 2017 and 26 January 2018 respectively. Dodie embarked on a North American tour to promote the EP in 2018.

Track listing

Charts

References

2017 EPs
Dodie (singer) albums
Self-released EPs